Marina Marta Vlad (born 8 March 1949) is a Romanian composer.

Biography
Marina Marta Vlad was born in Bucharest. She studied violin with Cecilia Geanta at the Music High School in Bucharest, and graduated from the National University of Music in Bucharest in 1973. She was awarded a composition prize from the university. After completing her studies, she took a position at the same school, where she taught until 2002. She married composer .

Works
Selected works include:

Orchestra: 
Symphonic Movement 1979
Images for strings and orchestra, 1980

Chamber ensemble:
Sonata for violin and piano, 1978
String Quartet No. 1, 1981
String Quartet No. 2, 1982
Inscriptions for Peace (string trio no. 1) for violin, viola and cello, 1984
Dream of Peace (string trio no. 2) for violin, viola and cello, 1985
String Trio No. 3, for violin, viola and cello, 1986
Light Rays, for flute, oboe and clarinet, 1988
Thoughts for the Future, for flute, violin, viola and cello, 1989
Still Life I, for oboe, 1996
Still Life II, for clarinet, 1997
Still Life IV, for violin, 1998
Still Life V, for viola, 1999
Still Life VI, for cello, 2000
Still Life VII, for flute, 2000
Still Life VIII, for bassoon, 2001

Choral works: 
This Country's Land (text by Ion Brad) cantata for baritone, mixed chorus and orchestra, 1987

Piano: 
Rondo, 1978
Sonata, 1981
Legend, 1983
In Search of the Game, 1983
In Search of the Game No. 2, 1994
Still Life III, 1997

References

1949 births
20th-century classical composers
Living people
Romanian classical composers
Academic staff of the National University of Music Bucharest
Women classical composers
Women music educators
20th-century women composers